Domenico Auria (active 16th century) was an Italian architect and sculptor of the Renaissance period, active in Naples. He was a pupil of Marliano da Nola. He is also known as Giovanni Domenico or Giovan Domenico Auria, or Domenico d'Auria.

References

Renaissance sculptors
Renaissance architects
16th-century Italian architects
16th-century Italian sculptors
Italian male sculptors